Morsoravis is an extinct genus of neoavian bird from the Early Eocene of Denmark.

References

Eocene life
Prehistoric birds of Europe
Prehistoric bird genera